McCunn is a surname, originating in Scotland but now widespread in many countries across the world.

Origins of the name
The surname is probably a variant of 'McCune', the Anglicised form of 'MacEoghainn'. The personal name 'Eoghain' is a Gaelic form of the Latin 'Eugenius', meaning 'noble', borne by a third-century bishop and martyr. Another theory suggests McCunn as a variant of 'McKeown', which comes from the Celtic 'Mac Eoin' ('Eoin' being the Irish form of John).

Family history
The first recorded bearer of the name was Gilcrist McKwnne, circa 1370, in the Calendar of the Laing Charters during the reign of King David II of Scotland. The surname was introduced to Ulster by Scottish settlers during the plantation of the province and later many McCunns emigrated during the Great Famine of Ireland. Since then, the McCunn family has spread throughout the world particularly to North America.

Notable McCunns
 Hamish MacCunn, Scottish composer of The Land of the Mountain and the Flood
 Ruthanne Lum McCunn, Eurasian author of Thousand Pieces of Gold
 John McCunn, corrupt New York judge and member of the infamous Tweed Ring
 Dickson McCunn, fictitious character in John Buchan's novels Huntingtower and The Adventures of Dickson McCunn
 Carl McCunn, wildlife photographer
 Thomas McCunn, the longest serving lifeboat at Longhope with over 300 lives saved

See also
McCune (surname)
McKeown
MacEwen

Surnames